Jesus María is a town and municipality in the Santander Department, in northeastern Colombia. 

The township was founded in the middle of the 18th century, and in 1870 it was elevated to the category of city, after rapid population growth. Finally in 1887 it became a municipality.

References

Municipalities of Santander Department